is a dam in Nabari, Mie Prefecture, Japan, completed in 1998. It is located about 2 miles east of Shōrenji Dam, which is actually on a different branch of the Nabari River.

References 

Dams in Mie Prefecture
Dams completed in 1998